Pedro Mabale Fuga Afang (born 1 January 1954) is an Equatorial Guinean politician and a retired football player and manager. He has been Secretary of State for Youth and Sports of Equatorial Guinea, Equatorial Guinea Olympic Committee General Secretary, Professor of Physical Education in several Centres and Colleges, Ministerial Sports Advisor.

Career
Mabale was a football player in Spain (National and University level).

Mabale works as national coach for football, basketball, volleyball and athletics teams.

Until 1998 Mabale coached the Equatorial Guinea national football team.

Also Mabale was a head coach of the Equatorial Guinea women's national football team.

In January 2001, Mabale was elected General Secretary of the Equatorial Guinea Olympic Committee. Later he was re-elected in 2005, 2009, and 2013.

References

External links
Profile at Comité Olímpico de Guinea Ecuatorial

1954 births
Living people
Place of birth missing (living people)
People from Bata, Equatorial Guinea
Equatoguinean footballers
Association footballers not categorized by position
Equatoguinean expatriate footballers
Equatoguinean expatriate sportspeople in Spain
Expatriate footballers in Spain
Equatoguinean football managers
Equatorial Guinea national football team managers
Equatorial Guinea women's national football team managers
Women's association football managers
Democratic Party of Equatorial Guinea politicians